was a town located in Katori District, Chiba Prefecture, Japan.

Kurimoto Village was established on April 1, 1889. It was raised to town status on April 10, 1924.

On March 27, 2006, Kurimoto, along with the city of Sawara, and the towns of Omigawa and Yamada (both from Katori District), was merged to create the city of Katori, and thus no longer exists as an independent municipality.

In November 2005 (the last data available before its merger into Katori), the town had an estimated population of 5,179 and a population density of 178 persons per km². Its total area was 29.05 km².

External links
Katori official site 

Dissolved municipalities of Chiba Prefecture
1889 establishments in Japan
Populated places established in 1889
Populated places disestablished in 2006
2006 disestablishments in Japan
Katori, Chiba